The following lists events that happened during 1980 in Cambodia.

Incumbents 
 Head of State: Heng Samrin 
 Prime Minister: vacant

Events

References

 
1980s in Cambodia
Years of the 20th century in Cambodia
Cambodia
Cambodia